X is the third and final studio album to be released by British-Irish pop group Liberty X, released on 10 October 2005. The album was the band's first release on the Virgin Records label, after being dropped from V2 Records in 2004. The album was released two years after their previous album, Being Somebody. The album was the least successful of their three studio albums, only peaking at number 27 on the UK Albums Chart and selling less than 50,000 copies.

Background
After being dropped from the V2 Records label, the band were quick to sign a record deal with rival label Virgin Records, and began recording their third studio album in April 2005. The label decided the band should experiment with their sound, and thus, enlisted the help of their long-time collaborators Goldust and Lucas Secon, as well as working with new collaborators, including Jud Mahoney, Pete "Boxsta" Martin and Johnny Douglas. The band also enlisted the help of rapper Rev Run, who feature on two of the album's ten new tracks. The band also decided to spice up four of their old classic hits, of which new mixes appear on the end of the album. The album's first single, "Song 4 Lovers", featuring Rev Run, was written and produced by band member Tony Lundon. For the track, Lundon experimented with the gospel and soul areas of music, as well as venturing into hip hop with the feature of Rev Run on the track.

The album's second single, "A Night to Remember", a cover of the Shalamar original, was released on 14 November 2005, as the official Children in Need single of the year. It was also backed with another cover of a disco track, "Everybody Dance" written by Nile Rodgers and Bernard Edwards. Neither "A Night to Remember" nor "Everybody Dance" feature on the original edition of the album, they are only listed as the album's second single due to their inclusion on the Xtra Edition. From January 2006, the band began touring the album on a small, theatre tour across the United Kingdom. Once the tour was complete, the band returned to film a music video for the track "X", which was released as the album's third and final single on 19 June 2006. Despite the release of a new single and a re-issue of the album entitled the Xtra Edition released two weeks later featuring "A Night to Remember" and "Everybody Dance", the album only managed to peak at number 27, and the band were dropped from the label shortly after. An Australian edition of the album, packaged with a bonus DVD containing several of the band's music videos, became the band's last ever official release anywhere in the world. "It's OK" and "Everybody Dance" were omitted from certain versions of the album for contractual reasons.

Critical reception

AllMusic editor Jon O'Brien found that "X is unfortunately not a swan song reflective of Liberty X's capabilities. Unlike their debut, which managed to capture the pop/R&B zeitgeist effortlessly, X is bogged down by dated production, lifeless ballads, and clichéd attempts at hip-hop [...] The band is certainly one of the better pop groups of the early noughties, but instead of going out with a bang, they've gone out with a bit of a damp squib."

Track listing

Charts

Release history

References

Liberty X albums
2005 albums
2006 albums
Virgin Records albums